"Here's a Health to the Company" is an Irish traditional song, based in the long history of emigration from Scotland and Ireland. Its strong tune has also been used for other Irish traditional songs and for the American anthem, "The Liberty Song".

Origins and history
The song might be of Ulster origin, perhaps derived from a Scottish original. Robin Morton lists it in Folksongs Sung in Ulster, and Paddy Tunney learned the song from North Antrim singer Joe Holmes. It is markedly similar to the Aberdeenshire song known as "The Emigrant's Farewell To Donside". Hugh Shields writes: "The song is quite well known in the northern counties of Ireland, and with varying text has been noted in Canada and Scotland, where it was perhaps composed."

The use of the tune by the eighteenth-century American Liberty Song could reflect an association with Ulster Scots tradition, as most early Irish emigrants came from this community.

There are several known variants on the lyric, but the set of words most frequently used today was popularised by The Chieftains who recorded the song on their 1989 album A Chieftains Celebration.

References

External links
 Youtube.com

Irish folk songs
Works about human migration
Year of song unknown
Songwriter unknown